Thomas Brotherton may refer to:

Thomas of Brotherton, 1st Earl of Norfolk (1300–1338), Lord Marshal of England
Thomas Brotherton (MP), British MP for Liverpool and Newton, Lancashire
Thomas William Brotherton (1782–1868), British general